Alastair Watt Macintyre Hay  (born April 1947) is a British toxicologist, and a Professor of Environmental Toxicology; he works primarily in the fields of chemical warfare and biological warfare (CBW).

Education
Hay gained a Bachelor of Science degree in Chemistry in 1969, in London, though had started with Maths and Chemistry, and a PhD in Biochemistry in 1973 for research on the metabolism of fructose (fructolysis) in the liver.

Career and research
Hay started his career at the chemical pathology department at the University of Leeds. He became Professor of Environmental Toxicology.

He provided assistance to the forming of the Chemical Weapons Convention in 1993, becoming international law in 1997. He works in the Leeds Institute of Cardiovascular and Metabolic Medicine. In 1995 he worked with Physicians for Human Rights (PHR). In 2004 he helped prepare the World Health Organization's (WHO) manual: Public health response to biological and chemical weapons.

Hay is an active advocate for promoting ethics to new generations of scientists, and he has headed a group of the International Union of Pure and Applied Chemistry (IUPAC) for educational materials on chemical warfare, which led to the creation of an online resource on "Multiple Uses of Chemicals". He has also represented the IUPAC for preparation of the Biological Weapons Convention (also known as the Biological and Toxin Weapons Convention).

Publications
 No fire, no thunder : the threat of chemical and biological weapons, Pluto Press, 1984, 
 A Magic Sword or a Big Itch: An Historical Look at the United States Biological Weapons Programme, Medicine, Conflict and Survival, 1999
 Simulants, Stimulants and Diseases: The Evolution of the United States Biological Warfare Programme, 1945–60, Medicine, Conflict and Survival, July 1999

Awards and honours
He was awarded the 2015 OPCW-The Hague Award by the Organisation for the Prohibition of Chemical Weapons. Hay was appointed Order of the British Empire (OBE) in the 2003 Birthday Honours for services to occupational health.

References

1947 births
Alumni of Royal Holloway, University of London
Academics of the University of Leeds
British toxicologists
Officers of the Order of the British Empire
Living people